Sir Walter Harry Evans, 1st Baronet (19 May 1872 – 7 November 1954) was an English hydraulic engineer, politician, and public servant.

Evans was born in Wolverhampton, son of Joseph Evans. He was a member of Staffordshire County Council for many years. In the 1920 New Year Honours, he was created a baronet, of Wightwick, near Wolverhampton, in the County of Stafford, for his services to the war savings committees during the First World War, with the letters patent being issued on 31 January 1920.

He married Margaret Mary Dickens in 1907. They had one son and two daughters. He was succeeded in the baronetcy by his son, Anthony.

Footnotes

References
Obituary, The Times, 9 November 1954
Kidd, Charles, Williamson, David (editors). Debrett's Peerage and Baronetage (1990 edition). New York: St Martin's Press, 1990.

1872 births
1954 deaths
People from Wolverhampton
Baronets in the Baronetage of the United Kingdom
English civil engineers
Hydraulic engineers
Members of Staffordshire County Council